Several unions have been referred to as 1199 within the United States.

Original 

 Local 1199, the historical national healthcare workers' union.

SEIU affiliates 
 1199SEIU, the largest healthcare worker labor union in the United States.
 SEIU Local 1199E which merged with SEIU Local 1998 to form 1199SEIU Maryland/DC Division.
 SEIU Local 1199NE, the New England branch of the original Local 1199.
 SEIU Local 1199NW, the Washington State branch of the original Local 1199.
 SEIU District 1199P, the former name for SEIU Healthcare Pennsylvania and the Pittsburgh branch of the original Local 1199.
 SEIU District 1199 WV/KY/OH, the West Virginia, Kentucky, and Ohio branch of the original Local 1199.

AFSCME affiliates 
 District 1199C in Philadelphia which voted to affiliate with American Federation of State, County and Municipal Employees (AFSCME) in 1989. It was originally established in December 1969.
 District 1199J formed in 1977 in New Jersey and which also voted to affiliate with AFSCME instead of SEIU.
 District 1199NM formed in New Mexico in 1974
 District 1199DC formed in Washington, D.C.

Defunct 
 Local 1199B, the defunct affiliate of Retail, Wholesale and Department Store Union originally organized by members of the first Local 1199.
 Local 1199D, a defunct union organized by members of the first Local 1199 which once sought recognition in Durham, North Carolina.
 Local 1199H, a former union effort by members of the original Local 1199 which failed to get recognition in Dayton, Ohio.

References 

1199